The 1st Blue Dragon Series Awards ceremony, organised by Sports Chosun was held on July 19, 2022, at Paradise City, Incheon, beginning at 7:00 p.m. KST. The event is the first award ceremony targeting streaming series contents in South Korea. It was hosted by Jun Hyun-moo and Im Yoon-ah and was broadcast live through LG Uplus and Naver Now. while the red carpet event was hosted by Jaejae.

The nominees were announced on July 6, 2022. The series which were produced, invested, and released from May 1, 2021, to April 30, 2022, were eligible for nominations. The jury of the Blue Dragon Series Awards is made up of six verified experts. To reduce the gap between experts and general viewers, netizens votes were also reflected as one judge, and the winner (work) was selected as a result of a total of those 7 votes.

Squid Game received the highest number of nominations of five. D.P. and Squid Game became the most winning programs winning two awards each.

Winners and nominees 
 Winners are listed first and emphasized in bold.

Television programs with multiple wins 
The following television programs received multiple wins:

Television programs with multiple nominations 
The following television programs received multiple nominations:

Presenters and performers 
The following individuals, listed in order of appearance, presented awards or performed musical numbers.

Presenters

Performers

References

External links 
  

Blue Dragon
1st
Blue Dragon
July 2022 events in South Korea